Percy Holland Latham (3 February 1873 – 22 June 1922) was a Welsh cricketer active from 1892 to 1906 who played for Sussex. He appeared in 63 first-class matches as a righthanded batsman who bowled right arm slow. He scored 2,580 runs with a highest score of 172 and took two wickets with a best performance of one for 0.

Latham was educated at Malvern College and Pembroke College, Cambridge. He played cricket for Cambridge 1892–94 and was captain in 1894. After graduating he taught at Haileybury College from 1895 until his death.

References

 
1873 births
1922 deaths
People educated at Malvern College
Alumni of Pembroke College, Cambridge
Welsh cricketers
Sussex cricketers
Cambridge University cricketers
Gentlemen cricketers
Worcestershire cricketers